Duško Pavasovič (born 15 October 1976) is a Slovenian chess player. He holds the title of Grandmaster, which FIDE awarded him in 1999.

Pavasovič was born in Split, Croatia (then Yugoslavia), and later took Slovenian citizenship. He won the Slovenian Championships of 1999 and 2006. Pavasovič took the national champion title again in 2007, when he won the Vidmar Memorial in Ljubljana. In the same year he finished fourth in the European Individual Chess Championship with a performance rating of 2765. Pavasovič played for the Slovenian national team in the Chess Olympiad, European Team Chess Championship and Mitropa Cup.

References

External links
Dusko Pavasovic games at 365Chess.com

1976 births
Living people
Chess grandmasters
Slovenian chess players
Slovenian people of Croatian descent
Sportspeople from Split, Croatia